Nonnewaug High School is a public school in Woodbury, Connecticut, United States, which serves the towns of Woodbury and Bethlehem, Connecticut. It is part of Regional School District #14. Before 1970, students in the district attended Woodbury High School, which has now become the middle school.  The school houses the Ellis Clark Regional Agri-Science and Technology Center, which draws students from additional surrounding areas. Nonnewaug serves approx 750 students, around a third of which are from the agriscience program. The name "Nonnewaug" comes from a local Native American Chief. The word, originally Nunnaw-auke, means “dry land".

Television station
Nonnewaug High School also contains the local television station NEAT TV available on Channel 194 for Spectrum customers in Woodbury and Bethlehem, Connecticut. This television station airs material created by students throughout the district, as well as live television events such as basketball games and Board of Education meetings.

References

External links
 

Schools in Litchfield County, Connecticut
Public high schools in Connecticut
Bethlehem, Connecticut
Woodbury, Connecticut